In cooking, al dente  describes pasta or rice that is cooked to be firm to the bite. The etymology is Italian "to the tooth".

In contemporary Italian cooking, the term identifies the ideal consistency for pasta and involves a brief cooking time. Molto al dente is the culinary term for slightly undercooked pasta. Undercooking pasta is used in the first round of cooking when a pasta dish is going to be cooked twice.

According to the American Diabetes Association, pasta that is cooked al dente has a lower glycemic index than pasta that is cooked soft.  When cooking commercial pasta, the al dente phase occurs right after the white of the pasta center disappears.

See also 

Food science
Molecular gastronomy
Culinary art

References

External links

Cooking
Pasta
Italian cuisine